The South Aegean Volcanic Arc is a volcanic arc (chain of volcanoes) in the South Aegean Sea formed by plate tectonics. The prior cause was the subduction of the African plate beneath the Eurasian plate, raising the Aegean arc across what is now the north Aegean Sea. It was not yet the sea, nor an arc, or at least not the one it is today, nor was there a chain of volcanoes. In the Holocene the process of back-arc extension began, probably stimulated by pressure from the Arabian Plate compressing the region behind the arc. The extension deformed the region into its current configuration. First, the arc moved to the south and assumed its arcuate configuration. Second, the Aegean Sea opened behind the arc because the crust was thinned and weakened there. Third, magma broke through the thinned crust to form a second arc composed of a volcanic chain. And finally, the Aegean Sea Plate broke away from Eurasia in the new fault zone to the north.

The extension is still ongoing. The current southern Aegean is one of the most rapidly deforming regions of the Himalayan-Alpine mountain belt. It is approximately 450 km long and 20 km to 40 km wide and runs from the Isthmus of Corinth on the Greek mainland to the Bodrum peninsula on the Turkish mainland.

Development of the Hellenic orogeny
The original proponent of a convergent boundary between Africa and Eurasia, who devised Tethys Ocean and Gondwana land for the purpose, and invented the -ides suffix, Eduard Suess, imagined a single great closure of Gondwana land on Eurasia, wrinkling up a mountain belt, the Altaides, that stretched from sea to sea. The simplicity and the name did not survive further scrutiny of the rocks. The mountain chain, subsequently the non-Suessian Alpides (he had his own Alpides, which amounted to the western Altaides), turned out to be the accumulation of orogenies in successive waves of advance. Not all the parallel chains derive from the same period or the same rocks. From the present, there is a virtual advance with a virtual resulting chain, but in fact the chain is mainly a composite of successive chains.

The mountains of Greece, or Hellenides (viewed as a singular collective thing) appear to have had a singular origin, superficially named "the Hellenic Orogeny". These are only terms of convenience to distinguish "Hellenic" from mountains of other countries. They are actually accumulated mountain chains resulting from accumulated orogenies over time. Currently three "waves", of orogenic activity can be distinguished, resulting in three "orogenic belts".

Preceding the first wave, the supercontinent, Pangaea, had already broken into Laurasia (a continuous band of Eurasia and the Americas), and Gondwana (all the rest). Between the two of them was Paleo-Tethys Ocean. The break-up had been caused by shifting currents in the mantle. A different location of an upwelling plume placed a divergent boundary in a new place, in this case across the north and east of Gondwana.

The Cimmeria terrane began to separate from Gondwana, closing Palaeo-Tethys in front of it and opening Neo-Tethys, or just plain Tethys, behind it. Cimmeria voyaged across the ocean to lodge against Eurasia, forming Cimmeria-Eurasia. The existing Cimmerides (named after the mountains of Crimea) account for the northernmost chains of the Alpides. Sometimes they are called the Hunic terranes, after the land of the Huns. They cover the Black Sea region, the northern Aegean, and the eastern part of the Balkans. Their earliest date is the "pre-Late Jurassic".

Subsequent is a two-phase Alpine Orogeny. In phase 1 (Cretaceous) the Tethys sea floor after depositing its Cimmerian passenger against Eurasia went on to dip beneath Cimmeria-Eurasia raising up the inner (eastern) Hellenides (Pindus range) and the Anatolides. Phase 2 is the arrival of another terrane, the Adriatic, or Apulian, Plate from the southwest, dipping under Cimmeria-Eurasia and raising its margin into the Dinarides and outer Hellenides in the Eocene and Oligocene.

The geologic stage was set for the latest orogenic zone, developing in the Miocene and Pliocene. It is customary to regard Tethys as gone, replaced by the Mesogean sea, plate and orogeny, which were transitional to the Mediterranean. The Mesogean Plate is of Gondwana; that is, the predecessor of the African Plate. This plate, moving north as Gondwana approached the Alpine-Cimmerian-Eurasian Plate, dove under it in the ancestor of the Hellenic Trench. The result was the raising of the forearc and the "exhumation" of Peloponnesus and Crete. It began to migrate to the south by back-arc extension, jutting out into the Mesogean Sea and becoming arcuate. From there the geologic story becomes more familiar, being mentioned above.

The Quaternary in the Aegean has been a time of faulting to adjust to the current pressures. In the Pliocene the extension had been NE–SW causing "normal high angle faults trending NW–SE". In the Quaternary the direction of extension changed to N-S with faults trending E–W. The type is predominantly strike-slip.

Volcanoes of the arc
The active portion of the South Aegean Volcanic Arc comprises a number of dormant and historically active volcanoes, including Sousaki, Aegina, Methana, Milos, Santorini and Kolumbo, Kos, Nisyros and Yali, and Akyarlar. Of these, only Santorini, Kolumbo and Nisyros have either erupted or shown any significant evidence of unrest during the past 100 years. 

One of the most noted volcanic eruptions from this arc occurred on the island of Santorini in the second millennium BC; during the catastrophic volcanic eruption of Santorini, the Bronze Age city of Akrotiri was destroyed, with archaeological remains becoming well preserved under the volcanic ash.

See also
 Hellenic arc
 Hellenic subduction zone
 Hellenic Trench
 Santorini

Citations

General and cited references

External links
 

Aegean Sea
Volcanic arcs
Volcanoes of Greece
Volcanoes of Turkey